F1 Championship Season 2000 is a racing video game based on the 2000 Formula One season, and was released by EA Sports for PlayStation, Microsoft Windows, PlayStation 2 and Game Boy Color.

The game features the 11 teams and 22 drivers which competed in the 2000 season (with the exception of Luciano Burti), a scenario mode, and 17 tracks. Cigarette and alcohol sponsors are replaced:
Jordan's Benson & Hedges sponsorship is replaced by "Buzzin Hornets"
Ferrari's Marlboro is replaced by an advertisement for Ferrari's 2nd world title
British American Racing's Lucky Strike is replaced by "Look Alike" with the logo blocked out
McLaren's West is replaced by "Mika" And "David"
Prost's Gauloises is replaced with a bar code
Jaguar Racing's Beck's is replaced with "Best's"
 Benetton's Mild Seven is replaced by "Benetton"

Reception

The PC, PlayStation, and PlayStation 2 versions received "average" reviews according to the review aggregation website Metacritic. Chris Charla of NextGen said of the latter console version: "If you don't mind the fact that the graphics aren't up to snuff, you will find a very good F1 game here." In Japan, where said console version was ported for release on 1 March 2001, Famitsu gave it a score of 28 out of 40.

Notes

References

External links
 

2000 video games
EA Sports games
Formula One video games
Game Boy Color games
PlayStation (console) games
PlayStation 2 games
Tiertex Design Studios games
Video games developed in the United States
Video games set in Australia
Video games set in Austria
Video games set in Belgium
Video games set in Brazil
Video games set in Canada
Video games set in France
Video games set in Germany
Video games set in Hungary
Video games set in Indiana
Video games set in Italy
Video games set in Japan
Video games set in Malaysia
Video games set in Monaco
Video games set in Spain
Video games set in the United Kingdom
Video games set in the United States
Windows games
F1 (video game series)
Video games developed in the United Kingdom